The Ilsan Bridge crosses the Han River in South Korea and connects the cities of  Gimpo and Goyang in the Gyeonggi Province. The bridge was completed in 2008.

See also 
 Transportation in South Korea
 List of bridges in South Korea

References

External links
 ilsanbridge.co.kr

Bridges in Gyeonggi Province
Buildings and structures in Goyang
Buildings and structures in Gimpo
Bridges completed in 2008